Indio Fashion Mall was a shopping mall in Indio, California, currently the site of the Indio Grand Marketplace.

Indio Fashion Mall opened on February 24, 1975. A  Harris Company department store (later became Harris Gottschalks in 1999) and a Sears anchored the mall which had 40 other mall shops. The mall had  of retail space on a  parcel.

Decline
The Sears store closed in 2004 (relocated to Westfield Palm Desert mall) and the Harris-Gottschalks in 2009.

By 2017, 70% of the storefronts in the mall were empty. On February 28, 2018, Los Angeles-based developer Haagen Company purchased the mall and its lot with the intention of eventual redevelopment.

Current status
The building is now called Indio Grand Marketplace and is an indoor swap meet, consisting of lower-end independent retailers and food outlets.

Redevelopment plans
The owner has plans to demolish the existing mall building and build a mixed-use development to cover the lot as well as an additional adjacent 20-acre parcel. It is to house retailers, casual dining and entertainment; up to 400 new residential units; and a hotel or other "hospitality element".

References

Shopping malls in Riverside County, California
Indio, California
Defunct shopping malls in the United States
Shopping malls established in 1975